Dinamo Kazan is a Russian women's volleyball club based in Kazan. The club was founded in 2002 and plays in the super league, the top Russian league.

Previous names
 Kazanochka (2002–2008)
 Dinamo Kazan (2008–2019)
 Dinamo-Ak Bars (2020–

History
The club was founded in September 2002 as Kazanochka and made quick progress in the lower leagues, arriving at the Super league in the 2005–06 season. On its second season at the Super league, the club reached the top four and earned a spot at the 2007–08 CEV Women's Challenge Cup.

The 2007–08 season was difficult for the club, who lost its main sponsor just before the start of the season. Faced with an uncertain future, the club just managed to fulfil its season competitions commitments with poor results, being relegated from the Super league and failing to qualify in the top 8 of the CEV Challenge Cup. With the club at the point of being dissolved, the Ministry of Internal Affairs of the Republic of Tatarstan directly intervened and took over the club. As a result, the club's name was changed to Dinamo Kazan.

Dinamo Kazan returned to the Super league in 2009–10 and signed players which improved the quality of the team, among them Jordan Larson, Ekaterina Gamova, Maria Borisenko, Tatiana Kosheleva, Ekaterina Kabeshova and Vera Ulyakina. These players (apart from Jordan Larson, who is American) formed the core of the Russian national team in 2010. Success and results came soon in the following seasons, the club won the 2010 Russian Cup, its first title, and would go on to win the Super league for five consecutive seasons (from 2010–11 until 2014–15). It won a second Russian Cup in 2012 and the 2013–14 CEV Champions League held in Baku, Azerbaijan, defeating the home team Rabita Baku in the semifinals by 3–0 and the Turkish side VakıfBank İstanbul also by 3–0 in the final. The title qualified the club for the 2014 FIVB Club World Championship played in Switzerland, where the club would beat Brazilian sides SESI-SP by 3–1 in the semifinals and Molico Osasco by 3–0 in the final to claim the title.

In December 2016, the club won its third Russian Cup after beating Dinamo Moscow by 3–1 in the final. Kazan won its third straight title in 2017, beating VC Yenisey Krasnoyarsk 3–0 in the decisive game.

Honours

National competitions
  Russian Super League: 6
2010–11, 2011–12, 2012–13, 2013–14, 2014–15 , 2019–20

  Russian Cup: 7
2010, 2012, 2016, 2017, 2019, 2020, 2021

 Russian Super Cup: 1
 2020

International competitions
  FIVB Volleyball Women's Club World Championship: 1
2014

  CEV Champions League: 1
2013–14

  CEV Cup: 1
2016–17

Team Roster
Season 2020–2021

Notable players

  Marina Babeshina
  Maria Borodakova
  Lesya Evdokimova
  Ekaterina Gamova
  Olga Khrzhanovskaya
  Tatiana Kosheleva
  Lesya Makhno
  Yevgeniya Startseva
  Ekaterina Ulanova
  Vera Ulyakina
  Regina Moroz
  Irina Zaryazhko
  Anna Malova
  Arina Fedorovtseva
  Elitsa Vasileva
  Natalya Mammadova
  Antonella Del Core
  Megumi Kurihara
  Onuma Sittirak
  Heather Bown
  Tayyiba Haneef-Park
  Jordan Larson
  Bethania de la Cruz
  Samanta Fabris
  Samantha Bricio

References

External links
Official site (Russian)

Dynamo Kazan
Volleyball clubs established in 2002
2002 establishments in Russia
Sports clubs in Kazan